The 2020 Central Pulse season saw the Central Pulse netball team compete in the 2020 ANZ Premiership. As part of their pre-season preparations, Pulse competed in the 2019 Netball New Zealand Super Club, finishing the tournament in third place. With a team coached by Yvette McCausland-Durie, captained by Katrina Rore and featuring Karin Burger, Aliyah Dunn and Ameliaranne Ekenasio, Pulse finished the regular ANZ Premiership season as minor premiers. In the grand final, Pulse defeated Mainland Tactix 43–31, winning their second consecutive premiership.

Players

Player movements

2020 roster

Pre-season

2019 Super Club
In December 2019, Central Pulse together with the other five ANZ Premiership teams plus Collingwood Magpies from Suncorp Super Netball and Wasps Netball from the Netball Superleague competed in the 2019 Netball New Zealand Super Club. Pulse finished the tournament in third place.

Group A
Matches

Final ladder

Semi-finals

Third place play-off

Queensland Firebirds series
Central Pulse hosted Queensland Firebirds for a two match series at Te Wānanga o Raukawa in Otaki on 8 and 9 February. Both teams one a match each.

Queenstown series
Central Pulse played matches against Mainland Tactix and Southern Steel in Queenstown.

Otaki tournament
Central Pulse hosted the official ANZ Premiership tournament at Te Wānanga o Raukawa in Otaki between 28 February and 1 March. All six ANZ Premiership teams took part.

Regular season

Fixtures and results
Round 1
 
Round 2

Round 3

Round 4
 

Round 5
 
Round 6

Round 7
 

Round 8

Round 9

Round 10

Final standings

Finals Series

Grand final

Award winners

New Zealand Netball Awards

Team of the season
Three Pulse players were included in Stuff's team of the season, selected by Brendon Egan.

References

2020
2020 ANZ Premiership season
2020 in New Zealand netball